Modern Vampires of the City is the third studio album by American indie rock band Vampire Weekend. It was released on May 14, 2013, by XL Recordings. The group began to write songs for the album during soundchecks on the supporting concert tour for their 2010 album Contra. After a period in which each member explored individual musical projects, they regrouped and continued working on Modern Vampires of the City in 2011. With no deadline in mind, the band brought in an outside record producer for the first time, Ariel Rechtshaid, to record the album.

With Modern Vampires of the City, Vampire Weekend attempted to depart from the African-influenced indie pop style of their previous records. Broadly experimental, the album's sound was the result of a variety of unconventional recording assets, including pitch shifting. Subjects explored on the record include characters with adult responsibilities, reflections on growing old, mortality, and religious faith. Vampire Weekend titled the album after a lyric in the 1990 Junior Reid song "One Blood" and chose a Neal Boenzi photograph of the 1966 New York City smog event as the album cover, citing the haunting qualities of both the title and photograph as the reason for using them.

Modern Vampires of the City debuted at number one on the Billboard 200, becoming Vampire Weekend's second consecutive number-one album in the United States. By December 2014, the album had sold 505,000 copies in the US. It was also a widespread critical success and ranked by several publications as 2013's best album, while finishing second in the annual Pazz & Jop critics poll. It has since been ranked on many lists of the best albums from the 2010s. In 2020, the album was ranked at number 328 on Rolling Stone's 500 Greatest Albums of All Time list.

Background
The success of Vampire Weekend's second album, Contra (2010), established the group as "one of the past decade's great indie-rock success stories." By the time their world tour for Contra ended, the band realized they had not taken a break in nearly five years. During the break, each member pursued individual projects: Baio performed DJ sets and scored the Bob Byington film Somebody Up There Likes Me, Batmanglij recorded solo material and produced tracks for Das Racist and spent time traveling India with three friends, and Koenig collaborated with Major Lazer. Koenig had broken up with his girlfriend shortly before the release of Contra and subsequently moved out of their shared apartment in New York. Feeling "weird and aimless", Koenig attempted to stay in Los Angeles but he returned to New York after four months.

Writing and recording 

Batmanglij and Koenig wrote most of the songs in Batmanglij's apartment, a former factory building in Brooklyn. By the time Vampire Weekend eventually regrouped in 2011, the band members had amassed plenty of written material and made sure to take their time making a new record. Koenig and Batmanglij met several times a week to write songs, some of which they'd later scrap. The also pair took a "writing retreat" to Martha's Vineyard, where they bore down and composed several new tracks at a rented cottage. Working with no deadline in mind, the group began recording Modern Vampires of the City.

The songs for Modern Vampires of the City were recorded at several locations, including Downtown Studios in New York City, Echo Park Back House and Vox Studios in Los Angeles, Slow Death Studios in Burbank, and the apartment of Rostam Batmanglij, Vampire Weekend's multi-instrumentalist and producer. Early drafts of the tracks "Obvious Bicycle" and "Worship You" were produced at OK Go frontman, Damian Kulash's old house in Chicago, before being taken to an official studio to work on. Batmanglij and Ariel Rechtshaid, the album's co-producer, used a pair of mirrored solid state MacBooks with UAD-2 Satellite Firewire Cards so they could take their recordings anywhere and work on them from separate locations with maximum ease.

Modern Vampires of the City was an attempt by Vampire Weekend to distance themselves from the sounds featured on their debut record and Contra. "Whenever we came up with something familiar sounding, it was rejected", said Rechtshaid. The band credits Vox Studios with the defining special quality of the recordings, especially the use of their vintage analog tape machines, with Batmanglij remarking, "Much of the overall sound and approach to the album was being able to record the drums to tape on an old Ampex machine." The group wanted a unique drum sound, and so they recorded in a room with high ceilings and had engineer David Schiffman use a "pretty non-conventional drum miking setup" in which a pair of Neumann U 47s were used as over head mics with RCA 77dx ribbon mics between the Neumanns and the drum kit for added texture. Tape recordings of the drums were then heavily treated and manipulated with Ableton Live plug-ins. Lastly, the band layered samples onto select portions of the drum recordings to accent or shape the finished tone.

Pitch shifting proved a major component of recording the album. For tracks such as "Step", drums were recorded on a Varispeed Tape deck set to a lower speed so that they would play back faster and more high pitched. Drummer Chris Tomson would then re-record the drums playing to the sped-up recording to get an uptempo live take. This second recording was then slowed back down to original speed to create an "underwater" effect. The effect is featured prominently on vocals as well. Ezra Koenig's vocals were run through Eventide H949 and 910 on tracks such as "Diane Young", with both the pitch and formant shifted changed to manipulate the sound of recorded vocals. Bass guitar was also recorded straight to tape "with a fairly ambient miking approach where the mic was three feet away from the cabinet". Vocals were recorded with Soundelux U99 Microphones, in combination with 1176 Classic limiter plug-in, Fairchild 670 Compressor and Elektro-Mess-Technik 140 Plate Reverb, giving the vocals a quality Batmanglij described as "buttery". For guitar sounds, Batmanglij chose not to mic his guitar and instead plugged his Gibson Les Paul direct-in to Pro Tools through a SansAmp Amp Emulation Pedal, a technique used by Jimmy Page.

Vampire Weekend concentrated their efforts on giving each recording "warmth", feeling that modern digital recordings lacked the sound quality of older records. In an attempt to make the tracks sound less harsh, the band and their recording engineers used a spectrum analyzer, Sonnox SuprEsser and heavily automated EQs to edit out harsher, colder frequencies and soften the mix. Vampire Weekend painstakingly listened to the record several separate times using technology from standard commercial iPod earbuds to professional equipment to ensure the record sounded nice regardless of equipment the listener owned. Desiring to "check the relative warmth levels", the engineers would "go in and perform surgery and automate EQs" in order to make the mixes listenable. The band felt the finished product was something of a third chapter and a continuation of material explored in their previous two efforts. "We thought these three albums should look like they belong together on a bookshelf", said Batmanglij. "We realized that there are things connecting the songs across three albums, like an invisible hand was guiding us. It does feel like we've been able to create three distinct worlds for each album, and yet have them be interconnected."

Music and lyrics

Modern Vampires of the City is a departure from the percussive, African-influenced indie pop of Contra. Batmanglij said that the album has a recurring tension that distinguishes it from the band's previous albums: "Even if the songs are mostly in a major key, there’s something that’s hanging out there that’s a little bit dark. And I think that’s reflective of the world." According to Heather Phares of AllMusic, the album abandoned the eclectic influences of Contra in favor of "a less audacious production style and smaller instrumental palette: guitar, organ, harpsichord, and the occasional sample combine into a rarefied sound that suggests a more insular version of their debut". She pointed to how the album is bookended by the stylistically narrow chamber pop on the songs "Obvious Bicycle" and "Young Lion".

"Step" was inspired by a lyric from Souls of Mischief's 1993 song "Step to My Girl", which sampled Grover Washington, Jr.'s cover of Bread's "Aubrey". The vocal melody of the chorus interprets the melody of "Aubrey" so close that the band had to clear it as a sample. The chorus vocals were recorded in Ableton Live using the onboard microphone in Batmanglij's MacBook Pro. Alexis Petridis viewed that some songs echo lesser known "musical tropes" from the group's previous albums—a mock Irish folk influence is heard on "Unbelievers", while "Step" features "Left Banke-inspired baroque pop". More generally, Steven Edelstone of Paste magazine regarded the music as a mix of "chamber pop and world-weariness". According to Brice Ezell from PopMatters, this album is "very much an indie rock record" because of Koenig's voice and diction, which reveals "the youth that he and his bandmates so often strive to shrug off." Ezell asserts that, on songs such as "Unbelievers", the "reckless abandon" expressed by the lyrics reveals "the group's grasp on the genuine rebellion that indie rock ought to strive for."

In comparison to the band's previous music, the lyrics explore more mature, world-weary themes such as growing old and disillusionment with American foreign policy. The album abandons the theme of privileged youth from their first two albums in favor of characters faced with adult responsibilities and reflections on the passage of time. Faith and mortality are recurring themes on songs such as "Unbelievers", "Worship You", and "Everlasting Arms". Koenig discussed Modern Vampires of the City in the context of the band's first three albums, which he compared to Brideshead Revisited: "The naïve joyous school days in the beginning. Then the expansion of the world, travel, seeing other places, learning a little bit more about how people live. And then the end is a little bit of growing up, starting to think more seriously about your life and your faith. If people could look at our three albums as a bildungsroman, I’d be O.K. with that."

Title and packaging 
The title was taken from a lyric in Junior Reid's 1990 song "One Blood". Koenig, a fan of the song, found the phrase "Modern Vampires of the City" humorous but also "haunting" as a title for their album. The album's title was revealed in the "Notices & Lost and Found" column of the classifieds section in The New York Times on February 4, 2013; vaguely defined, curlicued letters spelling the title were printed alongside the release date.

Koenig, Batmanglij, and art directors Matt de Jong and Asher Sarlin were credited with designing the album's packaging. For the cover art, the band chose an image taken by New York Times photographer Neal Boenzi, depicting a smog-shrouded, dystopian-looking New York City. Boenzi took the photo atop the Empire State Building in November 1966, when the city was plagued by a smog problem. Because of the subsequent rise in global air pollution, the band chose the photo believing it may have rendered "some kind of future".

Marketing and sales 

To promote the album, XL Recordings released "Diane Young" and "Step" as a double A-sided single on March 19, 2013. Modern Vampires of the City was released by XL on May 14, and Vampire Weekend played several concerts and music festivals shortly after, eventually embarking on a larger supporting tour throughout late 2013, beginning with a show at the Mann Center for the Performing Arts in Philadelphia on September 19. John Gentile of Rolling Stone reported that the band headlined "some of their largest venues to date" on the tour.

In the album's first week of release, it debuted number one on the Billboard 200 and sold 134,000 copies in the United States. It was Vampire Weekend's second consecutive number-one record on the chart, as well as the nineteenth independently distributed album to top the Billboard 200 in the Nielsen SoundScan era (1991–present). The record entered the British album charts at number three with first-week sales of 27,805 copies, becoming the group's third consecutive top-twenty album in the United Kingdom. By December 2014, it had been certified gold by the Recording Industry Association of America and sold 505,000 copies in the US. In 2014, it was awarded a diamond certification from the Independent Music Companies Association, which indicated sales of at least 200,000 copies throughout Europe.

Critical reception

Modern Vampires of the City was met with widespread critical acclaim. At Metacritic, which assigns a normalized rating out of 100 to reviews from mainstream publications, the album received an average score of 84, based on 51 reviews. Aggregator AnyDecentMusic? gave it 8.2 out of 10, based on their assessment of the critical consensus.

Reviewing the album in The Independent, Simon Price called it Vampire Weekend's "most cohesive and convincing effort yet" featuring their most accessible compositions. Ryan Dombal from Pitchfork said the singing suited the music fluidly on songs that sounded more natural and dynamic than the band's previous work. Alexis Petridis, lead critic for The Guardian, believed Vampire Weekend successfully avoided the gimmicky sounds of their previous albums and wrote more genuine lyrics dealing with mortality rather than "arch depictions of moneyed young Wasp lives". Slant Magazines Jesse Cataldo said the songs may sound dense and wordy, but they would be "immediately potent on a purely visceral level" for listeners, "striking a perfect balance that makes for what's perhaps the best album of the year". Nathan Brackett of Rolling Stone said the album featured a particular spirit and songcraft evocative of urban life, while Robert Christgau appreciated how many twists the coming of age themes revealed. In his review for MSN Music, Christgau found the record similar to the Beatles' Sgt. Pepper's Lonely Hearts Club Band (1967) because of how each lyric and musical element was "pleasurable in itself and aptly situated in the sturdy songs and tracks, so that the whole signifies without a hint of concept".

Other reviewers expressed some reservations. In the Chicago Tribune, Greg Kot wrote that Vampire Weekend occasionally blundered in an attempt at ingenuity with the songs "Ya Hey" and "Finger Back" while finding the album "darker, slower and weirder" than their previous records. NME journalist John Calvert believed the band had sacrificed "the sonic smarts that made them" on what was an otherwise "gorgeous album".

Accolades 
By the end of 2013, Modern Vampires of the City had been named the year's best album in a number of polls; according to Acclaimed Music, it was the highest ranked record on average in critics' year-end lists. AllMusic named it one of the year's 50 best records, and it was voted the second best album of 2013 in the Pazz & Jop, an annual poll of American critics nationwide, published by The Village Voice. Christgau, the poll's creator, ranked it first in his own list for The Barnes & Noble Review, writing in an accompanying essay that Vampire Weekend had made an art pop record that "simulates predigital warmth by tinkering with a dizzying panoply of studio stratagems and divides the most emotional songs of the band’s career into distinct parts impossible to enumerate due to how often the arrangements change up gorgeous drum tracks, but I dare you to dance to them". At the 2014 Grammy Awards, Modern Vampires of the City won in the category of Best Alternative Music Album. In 2020, Rolling Stone placed it at number 328 on the magazine's revision to the 500 Greatest Albums of All Time list.

Track listing
All lyrics written by Ezra Koenig, except where noted; all music composed by Rostam Batmanglij and Koenig, except where noted.

Personnel
Credits adapted from the album's liner notes.

Vampire Weekend
 Chris Baio – bass
 Rostam Batmanglij – piano, guitars, banjo, vocal harmonies and backing vocals, drum and synth programming, keyboards, shaker, lead vocals 
 Ezra Koenig – lead vocals, piano 
 Chris Tomson – drums

Production
 Rostam Batmanglij – production, mixing , string and brass arrangements, engineering
 Ariel Rechtshaid – production, mixing , engineering
 Scott Jacoby – mixing 
 Emily Lazar – mixing , mastering
 Rich Costey – mixing 
 Chris Kasych – mix assistance and Pro Tools engineering 
 Eric Isip – assistance 
 Joe LaPorta – mastering
 Shruta Kumar – score copying
 Dave Schiffman – engineering
 Michael Harris – engineering
 Nick Rowe – engineering
 Juan Pieczanski – additional engineering 
 Jeff Curtin – additional engineering 
 Justin Gerrish – Pro Tools operation, additional mix engineering
 Fernando Lodero – Pro Tools operation
 Angelo Vasquex – Pro Tools operation
 Rich Rich – Pro Tools operation
 Hans Crump – Pro Tools operation

Additional musicians
 Fanny Franklin – backing vocals 
 Angel Deradoorian – backing vocals , additional vocal arrangement
 Adam Schatz – saxophone 
 Jeff Curtin – additional drums 
 Johnny Cuomo – flistle 
 Brendan Ryan – accordion 
 Elizabeth Lea – trombone 
 Danny T. Levin – trumpet 
 Seth Shafer – tuba 
 Ariel Rechtshaid – additional drum and synth programming , additional bass 

Artwork
 Rostam Batmanglij – album cover design, compact disc design, art direction
 Ezra Koenig – album cover design, art direction
 Alex John Beck – band photo
 Asher Sarlin – compact disc design
 Matt de Jong – packaging layout, booklet design

Charts

Weekly charts

Year-end charts

Certifications

See also

 List of number-one albums of 2013 (U.S.)
 List of number-one independent albums (U.S.)

References

External links
 

2013 albums
Vampire Weekend albums
XL Recordings albums
Albums produced by Ariel Rechtshaid
Albums produced by Rostam Batmanglij
Grammy Award for Best Alternative Music Album
Albums recorded at Electro-Vox Recording Studios
Art pop albums
Chamber pop albums
Pop albums by American artists